Salalah International Airport (IATA: SLL, ICAO: OOSA) is the Sultanate of Oman's secondary international airport after Muscat International Airport. The airport features flights to regional destinations as well as a few intercontinental charter services from Europe. The airport recently won the Skytrax 5-Star Regional Airport Rating for its excellence in management and service.

History

Early years

An airfield was established at Salalah in 1935 by the British Royal Air Force for operations in support of the Sultan of Oman. Aircraft based there operated during the Jebel Akhdar War between 1954 and 1957, and the Dhofar War between 1962 and 1976. The British presence at RAF Salalah ended in 1977.

Salalah Airport opened as a civilian facility in 1977. Initially, it only handled domestic flights from Muscat and a few chartered flights to UAE or Qatar. Oman Air Services (OAS) began services to Salalah in 1982 and the inaugural flight of Oman Air arrived from Muscat in April 1993. Co-located with the civilian airport is a military airbase of the Royal Air Force of Oman called RAFO Salalah.

In 2003, Salalah Airport got the status of an international airport. Oman Air began scheduled services to Dubai from Salalah in 2003, leading to increased passenger traffic while other Gulf carriers operated flights only during the Khareef season. The following year, Air India commenced operations to Kozhikode and then to Cochin, making it the first airline to operate non-seasonal international flights to Salalah. Since 2003, the airport experienced increases in passenger traffic and civilian aircraft traffic. The area is a popular tourist destination for both local citizens and foreigners, especially from July to September when the Asian monsoon touches the region commencing the start of the Khareef season, making it an unusually attractive location within the normally arid Gulf region. Currently is considered the second most important airport in the country.

Development since the 2000s
In 2011, planning and construction began for the new state-of-the-art Salalah Airport. The move was made by the Ministry of Transport and Communication to further boost the city's tourism sector as well as to cater to the growing number of passengers flying to-and-from the city. Deals were signed with more than 20 different construction companies to complete the International Airport in deals worth $854 million. COWI A/S-Larsen Joint Venture had been the main consultant on the project, which was later taken over by HILL INTERNATIONAL LLC.

The Salalah Airport is planned to cater to one million passengers in the first phase. Also the construction of a second, 4-km runway is scheduled for the new airport. The airport's current runway will also be expanded to cater to the largest of aircraft, as well as the construction of a new parallel taxiway to the north. The international airport will also feature a 65,000 sqm passenger terminal building with car parking for up to 3,000 vehicles and a 57-meter high ATC Tower .

Design of the airport takes into account future development projects and allows expansion to cater for up to six million passengers per year, if required.

The new Salalah airport commenced operations in June 2015, with an Oman Air flight from Muscat becoming the first airline to arrive at the new airport. However, the new airport was officially opened in November 2015. The old airport situated to the south of the new one has since been transformed into a domestic and emergency airport.

Facilities
The new international airport has been marked as having more extraordinary facilities than the old airport. A new Duty Free service has been started by a private company in association with the OAMC. Many food counters have been providing services since its opening. Oman Air placed a new lounge opposite to the airside and gates in the new terminal for Business Class, First Class, and Economy Class passengers who are Gold and Silver Sinbad Service Card holders. The airport has a rating from passengers that it is providing an effective lounge and Duty-Free services. The new airport has four aerobridges with an air conditioning facility. It is expected that the new terminal will help to boost not only the city's tourism but also the local and international passenger movement.

Airlines and destinations

Statistics

See also
List of airports in Oman
Transport in Oman

References

External links

OpenStreetMap - Salalah
Salalah Airport Information

Traffic Statistic Sep 2016
Traffic Statistic 2018 Salalah & Muscat
Annual Report 2017 MOTC for Reference

Airports in Oman
Buildings and structures in Salalah